These are the Billboard magazine R&B albums that reached number-one in 1978.

Chart history

See also
1978 in music
R&B number-one hits of 1978 (USA)

1978